The 1999 Wyoming Cowboys football team represented the University of Wyoming in the 1999 NCAA Division I-A football season. The Cowboys offense scored 302 points, while the defense allowed 270 points. Despite a winning record, the Cowboys were not invited to play in a bowl game.

Schedule

References

Wyoming
Wyoming Cowboys football seasons
Wyoming Cowboys football